Rashmi R. Rao also known as RJ Rapid Rashmi, is an Indian radio personality and actor from Bangalore. She has worked as a radio jockey and a TV anchor. She also participated in a dance reality show Dancing star but got eliminated. She has also sung a song for the movie Deal Raja. She contested in reality show Bigg Boss Kannada (season 6).

RJ Rapid Rashmi currently works with 92.7 Big FM.

Awards 

 IRF- Indian Radio Forum silver winner for Best show "Retro Savaari" 2017
 IRF- Indian Radio Forum silver winner for Best show "Retro Savaari" 2016.
 Aryabhatta awardee - RJ of the year 2016
 Media awards - Best RJ of the year 2016

References 

Artists from Bangalore
Indian women radio presenters
Indian women playback singers
Bigg Boss Kannada contestants
Indian radio personalities
Indian radio presenters